A. J. Henriksen (born March 27, 1979) is an American professional stock car racing driver. He has previously competed in the ARCA Racing Series from 1995 to 2017.

Early life
Henriksen was born in Chicago, Illinois on March 27, 1979, to parents Arne and Barbara Henriksen. He frequently participated in skateboarding competitions and even received sponsorship opportunities from these competitions.

Racing career
Henriksen first gained an interest in racing when he began attending races with his father, and eventually was given the choice to move to San Diego, California to pursue a skateboarding career or a racing career. He subsequently chose the latter, and began racing in go-karts before progressing to late models, more prominently at Concord Motorsports Park. He also raced in various series such as the USAR Hooters Pro Cup Series, American Truck Series.

Henriksen first raced in the then ARCA Bondo/Mar-Hyde Series in 1995 at the age of 16, driving for his father's family-owned team racing in two races that year at Owosso Speedway and Salem Speedway. After racing in a combined 11 races (including three top-10 finishes) in the next four seasons, Henriksen expanded his schedule in 2000, entering in ten races (while failing to qualify for two), and achieving his first top-5 at Kentucky with a 3rd place finish. He would compete in twelve of the twenty-five races in 2001, finishing in the top-10 seven times with a best finish of 4th in Salem. In 2002, he would finish in the top five twice, and the same would said in 2003, which his most notable highlights being his runner-up finish at Charlotte and when he led 30 laps at Chicagoland Speedway before finishing 20th due to cutting a tire late in the race. He would finish a career-best 19th in the points standings in the latter season.

In 2004, Henriksen would downsize his schedule only running in 7 races, finishing in the top-10 three times. It was also during this year that Henriksen attempted to make his Nextel Cup debut at Pocono Raceway in August, driving the No. 90 Ford for Junie Donlavey. He unfortunately failed to qualify for the event however, in what was the final attempt for Donlavey Racing before closing down. He would remain in ARCA for the next four years, driving a majority of his races with his family owned team while driving for other teams.

After a two-year hiatus from the series, Henriksen would return in 2011, driving for his family owned team again in two events, failing to qualify at Indianapolis and finishing 11th at Salem. He would then run 6 races through 2012 and 2013 driving for Venturini Motorsports.

For 2014, Henriksen would not compete in ARCA, but would compete in the Trans Am Series, finishing third at New Jersey Motorsports Park.

In 2017, Henriksen would make one more ARCA start, driving the No. 75 Toyota for Bob Schacht at Road America, where he started 15th and finished 16th after being involved in a crash on the final lap. He has not run an ARCA race since then, and currently races in the Grand National Super Series.

Personal life
Henriksen currently dually resides in Sailsbury and Mooresville, North Carolina.

Motorsports career results

NASCAR
(key) (Bold – Pole position awarded by qualifying time. Italics – Pole position earned by points standings or practice time. * – Most laps led.)

Nextel Cup Series

ARCA Racing Series
(key) (Bold – Pole position awarded by qualifying time. Italics – Pole position earned by points standings or practice time. * – Most laps led.)

K&N Pro Series East

References

1979 births
Living people
Racing drivers from Chicago
Racing drivers from Illinois
NASCAR drivers
ARCA Menards Series drivers
Sportspeople from Chicago